Edwina Sandys  (born 22 December 1938) is an English artist and sculptor. She is the granddaughter of Winston Churchill.

Early life
Sandys was a debutante and was presented to Queen Elizabeth II. After attending a genteel girls’ school she went to Paris, then had a job "answering the doorbell" for a dress designer, and a stint as a secretary. She later became a Sunday Telegraph columnist and a novelist. Her career as an artist began in 1970.

Notable works

Sandys' work titled "Breakthrough", at Westminster College, Fulton, Missouri, features eight sections of the Berlin Wall. The college was the site of her grandfather Sir Winston Churchill's famous "Iron Curtain" speech in 1946 and is now the site of the National Churchill Museum.

Sandys also worked with the Missouri University of Science and Technology, located in Rolla, Missouri, to use a new way to make deep cuts in granite to create the Millennium Arch sculpture which stands across the campus from their Stonehenge monument. The Arch is a single trilithon with a vague silhouette of a man and a woman on each of its supporting megaliths, several meters from the arch.

In an interview with New York Social Diary Edwina discusses one of her more well known works, "Christa". Edwina describes her reasoning behind the sculpture, explaining that though she is not a religious person, she felt the need to represent women within what's often considered the most important image: Jesus on the cross. She states that the sculpture showed the suffering of women as well.

Publications
Her published works include the book Edwina Sandys Art, and an illustrated quiz book entitled Social Intercourse.

Honours 
 MBE 1984 New Year Honours for services to British cultural interests in New York.

Personal life
She is the eldest daughter and second child of Baron Duncan-Sandys and Diana Churchill, and a granddaughter of the statesman Sir Winston Churchill.

She married Piers Dixon in 1960 and they were divorced in 1970. They have two sons, Mark Pierson Dixon (b. 1962) and Hugo Duncan Dixon (b. 1963).

She married the architect Richard D. Kaplan in 1985; he died in 2016.

References

External links
Edwina Sandys at tate.org.uk

1938 births
Living people
20th-century British sculptors
20th-century English women artists
21st-century British sculptors
21st-century English women artists
British people of American descent
British debutantes
Daughters of life peers
Members of the Order of the British Empire
Edwina
Edwina